To the Shores of Hell is a 1966 Vietnam war film shot in Technicolor and Techniscope that was directed by Will Zens and starring Marshall Thompson, Richard Arlen, Dick O'Neill and Robert Dornan that was distributed by Crown International Pictures.  Dornan may possibly have co-written the film as his mother's maiden name was "McFadden".

Plot 
After observing war game manoeuvers as a referee, U.S. Marine Major Greg Donahue is posted to Da Nang, South Vietnam for his second tour of duty. He hears that his physician brother Gary (Robert Dornan) has been seen alive in the area after being captured by the Viet Cong. Donahue is accompanied by a Marine Sergeant (Bill Bierd), an American Priest (Richard Jordahl) who was formerly an Army chaplain in the Korean War and a Vietnamese guide (Jeff Pearl) to free his brother.

Production

Master Sergeant William V. Bierd was a Marine veteran of World War II, China, Korea, and Vietnam.  Besides playing Sgt Gabreski, Bierd was an uncredited technical advisor on the film as well as a technical advisor on Marine Corps uniforms to Gomer Pyle USMC.

The US Marine Corps allowed Zens to film amphibious landing exercises at Camp Pendleton that appeared at the start of the film. A Marine Corps HUS-1 helicopter was provided for the climax.

Toward the end of the movie, a radio operator said, "Loud and Clear, Miss Muffet, hold one", played by Gregory S. Morrison, a Marine Corps Private Second Class, from Camp Pendleton.  When the movie played at the Northgate movie theater, adjacent to Texas A&M University, the marquee read "To the Shores of Hell - STARRING Gregory S. Morrison".

Cast
Marshall Thompson as Maj. Greg Donahue
Richard Arlen as Brig. Gen. F.W. Ramsgate
Robert Dornan as Dr. Gary Donahue
 Bill Bierd  as Gunnery Sgt. Bill Gabreski
 Richard Jordahl as Father Jack Bourget
 Kiva Lawrence as Mary
 Freeman Lusk as Capt. Lusk
Dick O'Neill as Maj. Fred Howard
 Jeff Pearl as Mick Phin
 Marvin Yim as Maj. Toang

References

External links

Vietnam War films
1966 films
Crown International Pictures films
Films about the United States Marine Corps
Films set in Da Nang